Breakin' It Up is the debut album by pianist Barry Harris recorded in 1958 and released on the Argo label.

Reception 

Allmusic awarded the album 4 stars with its review by Jason Ankeney stating: "Barry Harris' debut Argo session captures a uniquely soulful interpretation of bop sensibilities. Light yet commanding, Breakin' It Up moves from strength to strength, belying the pianist's relative youth and inexperience".

Track listing 
All compositions by Barry Harris except as indicated 
 "All the Things You Are" (Oscar Hammerstein II, Jerome Kern) - 5:02   
 "Ornithology" (Charlie Parker) - 3:27  
 "Bluesy" - 4:31 
 "Passport" (Parker) - 3:42    
 "Allen's Alley"- 7:21 (Denzil Best)
 "Embraceable You" (George Gershwin, Ira Gershwin) - 2:55   
 "SRO" - 5:50  
 "Stranger in Paradise" (Robert Wright, George Forrest) - 4:42

Personnel 
Barry Harris - piano
 William Austin - bass 
Frank Gant - drums

References 

Barry Harris albums
1959 debut albums
Argo Records albums